William James Antonello (May 19, 1927 – March 4, 1993) was an American professional baseball player whose 12-season career included 40 games in Major League Baseball as an outfielder, pinch hitter and pinch runner for the  Brooklyn Dodgers.

Antonello attended Fort Hamilton High School and served in the United States Navy as a 17-year-old during World War II. He signed with the Dodgers in 1946 and spent seven full seasons in their farm system before his promotion to the 1953 edition. In his long big-league campaign, he started nine games, five of them in left field, scored nine runs, and collected seven hits and two bases on balls in 45 plate appearances. Those seven hits included one home run, hit off Ken Raffensberger of the Cincinnati Redlegs at Crosley Field on May 17. Antonello batted .163 with four runs batted in.

That year, Brooklyn captured 105 regular-season games and the National League pennant, but Antonello did not appear in the 1953 World Series, won by the New York Yankees in six games. He played professionally through the 1957 minor-league season.

Antonello settled in his wife's hometown of Saint Paul, Minnesota, where he had played Triple-A baseball during the early 1950s, and died in Fridley, Minnesota, at age 65 in 1993.

References

External links

1927 births
1993 deaths
Baseball players from Saint Paul, Minnesota
Brooklyn Dodgers players
Charleston Senators players
Daytona Beach Islanders players
Greenville Spinners players
Hollywood Stars players
Major League Baseball outfielders
Mobile Bears players
Newport News Dodgers players
Oklahoma City Indians players
St. Paul Saints (AA) players
Shreveport Sports players
Sportspeople from Brooklyn
Baseball players from New York City
Toronto Maple Leafs (International League) players